Kym Hampton (born November 3, 1962) is a retired professional basketball player. A 6'2" center, Hampton was drafted as the number four pick in the 1997 WNBA Elite draft and played three seasons for the New York Liberty  (1997–1999). Following a 12-year professional stint in Europe along with her three years in the WNBA, Hampton retired from basketball in 2000, due to worn cartilage in her right knee.

Early life

Born and raised in Louisville, Kentucky, Hampton is one of seven children born to Donald and Joyce Hampton. Hampton attributes her athletic ability to her father's side of the family and her uncle, Charlie Hampton, was a Central High School standout. Both Kym Hampton and Charlie Hampton played on the Kentucky All-Star team.

High school
Hampton attended Iroquois High School in Louisville, Kentucky. She joined the basketball team during her freshman year in 1976, at the urging of the head coach Marshall Abstain. Hampton ultimately scored 1,198 career points, averaging 23.5 points per game and 728 rebounds, averaging 14 per game. Kym was the starting center on both Kentucky All-Star and Kentucky East/West All-Star teams.

Hampton won the state championship in the shot put, three of her four years at Iroquois and set the state record 46' 4" in her senior year (1980). Hampton was asked by her track coach Bob Hanley, to compete in the high jump and discus during Iroquois Track Classic, and set two school records that day.  5'2" in the high jump and 116'6.5" in the discus.

College
Hampton attended Arizona State University from 1980 to 1984. During her college career, the Sun Devils made two consecutive trips, during the 1982 and 1983 seasons, to the Sweet 16, before being eliminated from the NCAA Tournament.

Hampton obtained her B.A. in theatre from Arizona State University in 1984. In 1989, Hampton was inducted into the Arizona State Hall of Fame. In 2014, Arizona State honored her by retiring her No. 32 jersey in a ceremony at Wells Fargo Arena.

Career
After graduation, Hampton played internationally, spending six years in Spain, four and one half years in Italy, one year in France, and one year in Japan. In 1997, Hampton was selected as the number four pick in the WNBA Elite Draft, by the New York Liberty, in its inaugural season. During her three-year WNBA career, she started every game including the inaugural WNBA All-Star Game where she was voted starting center. When Hampton retired in 2000, due to worn cartilage in her right knee, she averaged 9.3ppg, 5.8rpg, and 1.0 apg.

Post-career
Off the court, Hampton has pursued modeling, acting, and singing. She is an original CoverGirl Queen Collection model featured in print and a nationwide commercial. She was one of the original Lane Bryant "V-Girls" in a national V-Girl campaign. She's graced the pages of Glamour Magazine, Essence Magazine and other magazines. In 2012 Hampton was one of the women featured on ABC's The Revolution daytime TV show trying to improve themselves, particularly with regard to weight loss. Over a five-month period Hampton got her weight down to what it had been when she played professional basketball.

References

External links
WNBA Profile
 Arizona State University. Retrieved on 2009-10-17.
 

1962 births
Living people
American women's basketball players
American expatriate basketball people in France
American expatriate basketball people in Italy
American expatriate basketball people in Japan
American expatriate basketball people in Spain
Arizona State Sun Devils women's basketball players
Basketball players from Louisville, Kentucky
Iroquois High School alumni
New York Liberty draft picks
New York Liberty players
Women's National Basketball Association All-Stars
Centers (basketball)